The Flame is a 1970 album released by South African band The Flames produced by Beach Boys member Carl Wilson. It's the only non-Beach Boys album to be released on their Brother Records label—albeit distributed by Starday-King Records as opposed to Reprise.  According to Jerry Osbourne, "The Flame is widely-regarded as the first quad LP." To avoid confusion with James Brown's band of the same name, the "s" on the Flames was dropped, but it was retained on South African pressings. Unlike previous Flames albums which contain covers, all eleven tracks are original, written by the band.

Track listing
As per label, all songs written by Fataar/Chaplin/Fataar/Fataar.

"See the Light" – 3:06	
"Make It Easy" – 3:06	
"Hey Lord" – 3:49	
"Lady" – 3:28	
"Don't Worry, Bill" – 3:17	
"Get Your Mind Made Up" – 4:10	
"Highs and Lows" – 4:49	
"I'm So Happy" – 3:17	
"Dove" – 2:18	
"Another Day Like Heaven" – 5:42	
"See the Light (Reprise)" – 1:28

Personnel
 Blondie Chaplin – guitar, vocals
 Ricky Fataar – drums, vocals
 Steve Fataar – guitar, vocals
 Brother Fataar – bass, vocals
 Steve Desper – engineer
 Robert Jenkins – art direction, photography
 Carl Wilson – producer

Sources 

1970 albums
Brother Records albums
Albums produced by Carl Wilson